Melikhov is a surname. It may refer to:

Aleksandr Melikhov (born 1998), Russian football player
Anatoli Melikhov (born 1943), Kazakhstani ice hockey coach
Artyom Melikhov, Russian tenor singer
Igor Melikhov (born 1944), Russian diplomat
Yury Melikhov (1937–2000), Russian cyclist

See also
Melikhovo, a writer's house museum in the former country estate of the Russian playwright and writer Anton Chekhov. The estate is about forty miles south of Moscow near Chekhov

Russian-language surnames